Conchita Martínez was the defending champion, but lost in the semifinals to Jana Novotná.

Novotná went on to win the title, defeating Ai Sugiyama in the final 6–3, 6–4.

Seeds
A champion seed is indicated in bold text while text in italics indicates the round in which that seed was eliminated. The top four seeds received a bye to the second round.

  Jana Novotná (champion)
  Irina Spîrlea (quarterfinals)
  Arantxa Sánchez Vicario (quarterfinals)
  Conchita Martínez (semifinals)
  Anke Huber (first round)
  Sandrine Testud (quarterfinals)
  Brenda Schultz-McCarthy (second round)
  Sabine Appelmans (first round)

Draw

Final

Section 1

Section 2

External links
 1997 Kremlin Cup draw

Kremlin Cup
Kremlin Cup